Crown Letters and Punctuation and Their Placements is a manifesto published by the Egyptian Ministry of Education and written by Abdulqader Aashour in 1932. It was released after the creation of the Crown Script to be a manual of sorts.

Crown Script 
The Crown script—is a modern Arabic script fabricated by Egyptian calligrapher Mohammad Mahfouz in 1931 and proposed by then-King Fuad I. The purpose of inventing this script was to implement capital letters into the Arabic script to be used similarly to English capital letters—which it does very well.
Capital Crown Letters are different from small letters in a sense that they possess a loop—or an upside-down لا—on top of them; letters that may connect to the next letter also connect to that loop, whereas letters that do not connect to the next letter also don't connect to that loop.

In 1932, the Egyptian Ministry of Education released a manifesto titled Crown Letters and Punctuation Marks and Their Positions of Use, which thoroughly explained the script and was very likely the first book ever written in Crown script. Punctuation was also included because, in fact, there were no set rules for Arabic writing and everyone wrote as they pleased; as such, punctuation was just thrown anywhere into a sentence for aesthetic purposes rather than simplifying sentences to make concepts easier to grasp for the reader. Even now, punctuation is very badly abused—this is most obvious on social networking websites.

The manifesto concluded that [see below for supplements]:
 Big letters as shown in supplement one are to be called Crown Letters; taking into account the form in which these letters are enthroned and because they were developed under the will of the Crown.
 Punctuation marks are to be used as shown in supplement two.
 Crown Letters are to be used as shown in supplements three and four.
 The Ministry of Education may use all the wherewithal necessary to popularize the use of the Crown Letters and punctuation marks and all that is required by the implementation of that from integrating them into curricula to the promulgation of their benefits to the crowds to the facilitation of their use in the press.

More accurately, however, the Crown script isn't really a script of its own; it's more of an addition to existing scripts. The Ministry of Education's manifesto specified that Crown Letters may be used with Naskh and Rok’a scripts.

You may find a PDF version of the book here.

References

Letters (message)
Arabic language
Punctuation
Education in Egypt